"That Look" is a song by American house-music group De'Lacy featuring vocals by lead vocalist Rainie Lassiter, and was released in 1996. Kevin Hedge and Josh Milan wrote the lyrics, which was published by Warner Chappell Music Ltd., and Blaze helmed the production. It was a sizeable hit in clubs in both the UK and US, and charted at number19 on the UK Singles Chart, but fared better on the UK Dance Chart, reaching number two. In Italy, the single was a top 30 hit, while on the Eurochart Hot 100, it peaked at number 41 in September 1996. In the US, it peaked at number 27 on the Billboard Hot Dance Club Songs chart. A music video was also produced to promote the single.

Critical reception
Larry Flick from Billboard wrote, "The wait for a follow-up to De'Lacy's soon-to-be-classic "Hideaway" is finally over. "That Look" begins to circulate on white labels sporting wonderfully hypnotic house beats by Hani—who is mere seconds away from permanently busting out of the underground and giving dance music's top guns a run for the cash. He provides a dreamy contrast to the track's vigorously soulful lead vocals, while never sacrificing the song's infectious chorus. On the way are remixes by the Deep Dish posse. Another clique rarely hitting a false note, Deep Dish will likely round out what is sure to be an explosive single." 

Pan-European magazine Music & Media described it as "another easily accessible house number with catchy vocals. [...] Nearly guaranteed to make another big impression on radio and sales charts across Europe." Andy Beevers from Music Weeks RM Dance Update rated the song four out of five. He remarked that Hani's Club Look mix "builds gradually with choice vocal loops before the arrival of the full song, which is as catchy as 'Hideaway' and once again, manages to pack real power without resorting to the usual cliches and diva-style histrionics. The beats gallop along very nicely with waves of throbbing and juddery synths plus plenty of breakdowns that display the real class of the vocal."

Track listing
 CD single"That Look" (Deep Dish Radio Edit) – 3:37
"That Look" (Hani's Club Look) – 11:52
"That Look" (Deep Dish Remix Part 1&2) – 15:16

 CD maxi'
"That Look" (Hani's Radio Edit) – 4:07
"That Look" (Deep Dish Radio Edit) – 4:06
"That Look" (Hani's Club Look) – 11:47
"That Look" (Deep Dish Remix Part 1&2) – 15:15

Charts

References

 

1996 singles
1996 songs
American electronic dance music songs
American house music songs
Deconstruction Records singles
MCA Records singles